The ARIA Albums Chart ranks the best-performing albums and extended plays (EPs) in Australia. Its data, published by the Australian Recording Industry Association, is based collectively on the weekly physical and digital sales and streams of albums and EPs. In 2022, 34 albums claimed the top spot, with the first, 30 by Adele, continuing its run from the end of 2021. Meat Loaf returned to number one with his best-selling 1977 debut album Bat Out of Hell following his death in January 2022. Future Nostalgia also returned to the top for a third week in a third consecutive year. Nine artists, the Wiggles, Charli XCX, Machine Gun Kelly, Wet Leg, Future, Daniel Johns, Spacey Jane, Yungblud and Meg Mac, achieved their first number-one album.

Chart history

Number-one artists

See also
 2022 in music
 List of number-one singles of 2021 (Australia)

References

2022
Australia albums
Number-one albums